Feudin' Rhythm is a 1949 American Western film directed by Edward Bernds and written by Barry Shipman. The film stars Eddy Arnold, Gloria Henry, Kirby Grant, Isabel Randolph, Tommy Ivo, Fuzzy Knight and Carolina Cotton. The film was released on November 3, 1949, by Columbia Pictures.

Plot

Cast          
Eddy Arnold as Eddy Arnold
Gloria Henry as Valerie Kay
Kirby Grant as Ace Lucky
Isabel Randolph as Lucille Upperworth
Tommy Ivo as Bobby Upperworth
Fuzzy Knight as Horseshoe
Carolina Cotton as Carolina Cotton
Dick Elliott as Charles Chester Upperworth
Maxine Gates as Madam Kerphew
John Dehner as Gregory Biddleton
Emil Sitka as Viele Smielie
Jason Robards Sr. as Mr. Rushman
George Lloyd as Sheriff Hogan
Gene Roth as Policeman
John Cason as Pete

References

External links
 

1949 films
American Western (genre) films
1949 Western (genre) films
Columbia Pictures films
Films directed by Edward Bernds
American black-and-white films
1940s English-language films
1940s American films